Andrew Everingham (born 29 January 1987) is an Australian professional rugby footballer currently playing rugby union for the Fukuoka Sanix Blues in the Japanese Second Division Rugby. He previously played rugby league in the National Rugby League as a three-quarter back for the South Sydney Rabbitohs, and also played for the Philippines.

Background
Born in Newcastle, New South Wales, Everingham played his junior football for the Thornton Beresfield Bears before being signed by the Manly-Warringah Sea Eagles.  Everingham has a Filipino mother and Australian father.

Professional playing career

Rugby League

Everingham played for the Sea Eagles' NSW Cup reserve-grade team in 2006 before moving on to the Western Suburbs Magpies, also in the NSW Cup. In 2010, Wests Tigers coach Tim Sheens asked Everingham to come and train with the first-grade team 2 days a week. However, he could not break into the NRL.

In 2011, Everingham signed a 1-year contract with the South Sydney Rabbitohs after new Souths coach Michael Maguire was impressed by a highlights package of Everingham that was sent to a number of clubs. In Round 3 of the 2012 NRL season he made his NRL debut for the Rabbitohs against Penrith Panthers. He scored a try on debut, in just the second minute of the game with his first touch of the ball. He then scored at least one try in his next four games including two tries in three of those games, giving him one of the most successful starts to a career in terms of try-scoring of all time. On 4 May 2012, Everingham re-signed with the Rabbitohs for 1 year.

In July 2012, Everingham confirmed his availability to play for the Philippines national rugby league team in the post season, and made his debut in the Asian Cup in 2013.

Rugby Union
With the 2013 NRL season drawing to a close, questions on whether or not South Sydney would re-sign him emerged. Everingham showed interest in staying with much improved Bunnies. By this time Japanese Rugby Union teams have expressed interest in signing Everingham due to his Asian passport.

On 20 August 2013, it was announced that Japanese 2nd division Rugby Union side Fukuoka Sanix Blues had successfully procured Everingham's services for the coming season to start on October of the same year. Everingham was reported to have been offered a $500,000 per year contract; almost four times an extension contract from the South Sydney which was at $130,000.

References

External links
2012 South Sydney Rabbitohs profile

1987 births
Living people
Australian expatriate sportspeople in Japan
Australian people of Filipino descent
Australian rugby league players
Australian rugby union players
Competitors at the 2015 Southeast Asian Games
Expatriate rugby union players in Japan
Filipino expatriate sportspeople in Japan
Maitland Pickers players
Munakata Sanix Blues players
North Sydney Bears NSW Cup players
People from Newcastle, New South Wales
Philippines international rugby union players
Philippines national rugby league team players
Rugby league centres
Rugby league players from Newcastle, New South Wales
Rugby league wingers
Rugby union players from Newcastle, New South Wales
South Sydney Rabbitohs players
Southeast Asian Games gold medalists for the Philippines
Southeast Asian Games medalists in rugby union
Waratah Mayfield Cheetahs players
Western Suburbs Magpies NSW Cup players